Paul William Fletcher (born 16 January 1965) is an Australian politician who served as Minister for Communications, Urban Infrastructure, Cities and the Arts from 2020 to 2022. Fletcher is a member of the Liberal Party of Australia, and has served as member of parliament (MP) for the division of Bradfield since 2009.

Fletcher entered politics after winning the 2009 Bradfield by-election. He served as the Parliamentary Secretary to the Minister for Communications between September 2013 and September 2015 under the Abbott ministry, and between September 2015 and July 2016, he served as the Minister for Major Projects, Territories, and Local Government. He briefly served as the Minister for Territories, Local Government and Major Projects between October and December 2017. He served as Minister for Urban Infrastructure and Cities from July 2016 to August 2018 in the second Turnbull ministry, and Minister for Families and Social Services in the first Morrison ministry.

Early life
Fletcher was born in Devizes, Wiltshire, England, the son of Clive and Mary Fletcher. His father was a professor of computational engineering. He arrived in Australia with his family at the age of two, and held British citizenship until 2009 when he renounced it to stand for parliament.

Fletcher grew up in the eastern suburbs of Sydney, where he was the dux of Sydney Grammar School in 1982. He subsequently attended the University of Sydney, graduating with first-class honours in economics and laws. At university he co-wrote two plays, titled The Fax of Life and Annually Fixated. In 1993 Fletcher was awarded a Fulbright Scholarship to go to Columbia University's Graduate School of Business in New York City, where he completed a Master of Business Administration degree.

Fletcher is one of seven Liberal MPs in the 46th Parliament of Australia who have obtained degrees at an Oxbridge or Ivy League university, the others being Alan Tudge, Angus Taylor, Andrew Laming, Dave Sharma, Greg Hunt and Josh Frydenberg.

Professional career
In his early career, Fletcher worked as a management consultant, a corporate lawyer for Mallesons Stephen Jaques, and a corporate strategist for TNT Limited. From 1996 to 2000, he worked as chief of staff to Minister for Communications Richard Alston, a Liberal Party politician. Fletcher joined Optus in 2000 and worked as director of corporate and regulatory affairs until 2008. He was a staunch opponent of Telstra, accusing the latter company of being a monopoly.

After leaving Optus, Fletcher founded Fletchergroup Advisers, a strategy consultancy focusing on the communications industry. He also wrote a book entitled Wired Brown Land? Telstra's Battle for Broadband that was published in 2009, discussing Telstra's bid to operate the Australian Government's proposed National Broadband Network.

Political career
Fletcher joined the Young Liberals at the age of 16. In 2009, he won preselection from a field of 17 people to be the Liberal Party candidate at the 2009 Bradfield by-election, following the retirement of former Liberal leader Brendan Nelson. Bradfield, a seat located in the North Shore of Sydney, has been held continuously by the Liberal Party since its creation in 1949, and is one of the safest Liberal Party seats in Parliament. He was required to renounce his dual British citizenship before entering Parliament, as required by Section 44 of the Constitution of Australia. Fletcher had previously unsuccessfully sought Liberal Party pre-selection in the Division of Cook in 2007.

Under the Abbott government, Fletcher was the Parliamentary Secretary to the Minister for Communications. In September 2015 Fletcher was appointed as the Minister for Major Projects, Territories, and Local Government in the Turnbull government. Fletcher has served as the Minister for Urban Infrastructure and Cities since July 2016.

Fletcher is a member of the Moderate/Modern Liberal faction of the Liberal Party.

In June 2022 he was appointed Manager of Opposition Business in the House.

Personal life
Fletcher is married to jeweller Manuela Zappacosta and they have one son, and they live with her son from a previous marriage.

References

External links
Australian Parliament House biography
Paul Fletcher's campaign website for the Bradfield by-election 2009
Australian Telecommunications Users Group biography

1965 births
Living people
English emigrants to Australia
People who lost British citizenship
Naturalised citizens of Australia
Liberal Party of Australia members of the Parliament of Australia
Members of the Australian House of Representatives
Members of the Australian House of Representatives for Bradfield
Australian businesspeople
University of Sydney alumni
Columbia Business School alumni
People from Devizes
Abbott Government
Turnbull Government
21st-century Australian politicians
Government ministers of Australia
Morrison Government
Fulbright alumni